List by Family Name: A - B - C - D - E - F - G - H - I - J - K - M - N - O - R - S - T - U - W - Y - Z
 Kaga Otohiko (born 1929)
 Kagawa Toyohiko (July 10, 1888 - April 23, 1960)
 Kaiko Takeshi (December 30, 1930 – December 9, 1989)
 Kaionji Chogoro (November 5, 1901 – December 1, 1977)
 Kajii Motojirō (February 17, 1901 – March 24, 1932)
 Kajio Shinji (born December 24, 1947)
 Ikki Kajiwara (September 4, 1936 – January 21, 1987)
 Kajiyama Toshiyuki (1930–1975)
 Kakinomoto no Hitomaro (c. 662 – 710)
 Kazuma Kamachi
 Kambara Ariake (March 15, 1876 – February 3, 1952)
 Kambayashi Chōhei (born 1953)
 Kamo no Chōmei (1155–1216)
 Kanagaki Robun (January 6, 1829 – November 8, 1894)
 Kanai Mieko (born 1947)
 Kanbe Musashi (born January 16, 1948)
 Hitomi Kanehara (born 1983)
 Kaneko Misuzu (April 11, 1903 – March 10, 1930)
 Kaneko Mitsuharu (1895–1975)
 Karai Senryu (1718–1790)
 Kasai Zenzo (1887–1928)
 Noburu Katagami (1884–1928)
 Katayama Kyoichi (born 1959)
 Masato Kato (born 1963)
 Kawabata Yasunari (June 14, 1899 – April 16, 1972)
 Kawada Jun
 Kawaguchi Matsutaro (1899–1985)
 Kawai Sora (1649–1710)
 Kawaji Ryuko (1888–1959)
 Kawakami Hiromi (born April 1, 1958)
 Kawakami Kikuko (February 9, 1904 – October 26, 1985)
 Kawakami Kiyoshi (1873–1949)
 Kawakami Minoru (born 1975)
 Kawamata Chiaki (born December 4, 1948)
 Kawatake Mokuami (February 3, 1816 – January 22, 1893)
 Kazuki Sakuraba (born 1971)
 Kikai Hiroh (born 1945)
 Kikuchi Kan (December 26, 1888 – March 6, 1948)
 Kikuoka Kuri (1909–1970)
 Ki no Tsurayuki (870–945)
 Kinoshita Junji (1914–2006)
 Kinoshita Mokutaro (August 1, 1885 – October 15, 1945)
 Kinoshita Rigen (1886–1925)
 Kirino Natsuo (October 7, 1951)
 Kishi Yusuke (born 1959)
 Kyōko Kishida (April 29, 1930 – December 17, 2006)
 Rio Kishida (1950–2003), playwright
 Kita Ikki (April 3, 1883 – August 19, 1937)
 Kita Morio (born 1927)
 Kitabatake Chikafusa (1293–1354)
 Kitabatake Yaho (1903–1982)
 Kitahara Hakushu (January 25, 1885 – November 2, 1942)
 Kitakata Kenzo (born October 26, 1947)
 Kitamura Kaoru (born December 28, 1949)
 Kitamura Tokoku (December 29, 1868 – May 16, 1894)
 Kiuchi Kazuhiro (born September 14, 1960)
 Kobayashi Hideo (April 11, 1902 – March 1, 1983)
 Kobayashi Issa (June 15, 1763 – January 5, 1828)
 Kobayashi Takiji (October 13, 1903 – February 20, 1933)
 Koda Aya (1904–1990)
 Kōda Rohan (July 23, 1867 – July 30, 1947)
 Kogyoku Izuki (born 1984)
 Koizumi Yakumo (June 27, 1850 – September 26, 1904)
 Kojima Masajiro (1894–1984)
 Kojima Nobuo (February 28, 1915 – October 26, 2006)
 Kojima Usui (December 29, 1873 – December 13, 1948)
 Kokan Shiren (1278–1347)
 Komaki Omi (May 11, 1894 – October 29, 1952)
 Komatsu Sakyo (born 1931)
 Kon Hidemi (November 6, 1903 – July 30, 1984)
 Chiaki J. Konaka (born April 4, 1961)
 Kondo Marie (born c. 1985)
 Kondo Yoji (born 1933)
 Kono Tensei (January 27, 1935 – January 29, 2012)
 Koshiba Hiroshi (November 9, 1884 – June 19, 1925)
 Kosugi Tengai (November 7, 1865 – September 1, 1952)
 Koushun Takami (born January 10, 1969)
 Kubota Mantaro (November 11, 1889 – May 6, 1963)
 Kume Masao (November 23, 1891 – March 1, 1952)
 Kunikida Doppo (July 15, 1871 – June 23, 1908)
 Kurata Hyakuzo (23 February 1891 – 12 February 1943)
 Kurimoto Kaoru (February 13, 1953 – May 26, 2009)
 Kuriyakawa Hakuson (1880–1923)
 Kuroda Seiki (June 29, 1866 – July 15, 1924)
 Kuronuma Ken (1902–1985)
 Kuroshima Denji (December 12, 1898 – October 17, 1943)
 Kurumizawa Koshi (26 April 1925 – 23 May 1994)
 Kyogoku Natsuhiko (born 1963)
 Kyokutei Bakin (1767–1848)

K